François-Jean Willemain d'Abancourt (22 July 1745, Paris – 16 June 1803, Paris) was a French man of letters and bibliophile.

Willemain wrote a great number of books, including some poems, plays and fables, most of them inserted in the Mercure de France (1777), tragedies, epistles and drama essays. He also translated into verse the tragedy Der Tod Adams (1757) by Friedrich Gottlieb Klopstock.

He is best known for the beautiful collection of plays he gathered because he would acquire them at any price in all editions and manuscripts. He also wrote under the pseudonym "Léonard Gobemouche".

References

Sources 

 "François-Jean Willemain d'Abancourt", in Charles Weiss, Biographie universelle, ou Dictionnaire historique contenant la nécrologie des hommes célèbres de tous les pays, 1841

External links 
 Le Chevalier de Faublas read online.

18th-century French male writers
18th-century French dramatists and playwrights
18th-century French poets
French fabulists
French translators
French book and manuscript collectors
German–French translators
1745 births
Writers from Paris
1803 deaths
18th-century French translators